Sklep Theatre (Czech: Divadlo Sklep) is a theatre in the Czech capital of Prague, founded in 1971 by Milan Šteindler and David Vávra. It is currently based at the Divadlo Dobeška building in Braník.

History

Origins
Sklep Theatre was originally founded in 1971 by two fourteen-year-olds, Milan Šteindler and David Vávra, in the cellar of Vávra's grandmother's house, under the name Kobil klub. They performed only for friends during the first few years, but in the latter part of the 1970s, their audience began to grow. The ensemble expanded from the initial duo, adding a number of actors, including Tomáš Vorel, Eva Holubová, Tomáš Hanák, Jiří Burda, and František Váša.

Divadlo Dobeška

Since 1980, the ensemble has been based at the Dobeška cultural building. During this decade, Sklep developed working relationships with other performing groups, including Recitation Group Vpřed (Czech: Recitační skupina Vpřed), Pantomime Group Mimóza (Czech: Pantomimická skupina Mimóza), Art Theatre Kolotoč (Czech: Výtvarné divadlo Kolotoč), and Ballet Unit Křeč (Czech: Baletní jednotka Křeč). These became known as the Prague Five (Czech: Pražská pětka), and in 1988, they jointly created a film of the same name, directed by Tomáš Vorel.

Post-Velvet Revolution
After the Velvet Revolution in Czechoslovakia in November 1989, Sklep put together two productions, with which it toured the entire nation: Tajů plný ostrov and Mlýny. The latter is based on Život před sebou, a play by Václav Havel and Karel Brynda.

Selection of past and current members

 Milan Šteindler
 David Vávra
 Tomáš Vorel
 Eva Holubová
 Tomáš Hanák
 Jiří Burda
 František Váša

 Robert Nebřenský
 Václav Marhoul
 Jiří Macháček
 František Skála
 Ondřej Trojan
 Jaroslav Róna
 Ivana Chýlková

References

External links

 
 Divadlo Dobeška official website

Theatres in Prague
Buildings and structures in Prague
Tourist attractions in Prague
Culture in Prague
Theatres completed in 1971
1971 establishments in Czechoslovakia
20th-century architecture in the Czech Republic